Marcy Playground is the debut studio album by American alternative rock band Marcy Playground, released on February 25, 1997, on EMI. It was reissued later that year on October 7 on Capitol Records with a large amount of promotion for the single "Sex and Candy," which became the band's breakthrough single, spending a then-record 15 weeks at No. 1 on the Billboard Modern Rock Tracks chart.

The album also includes the singles "St. Joe on the Schoolbus" and "Sherry Fraser" both of which received moderate radio and MTV2 airplay.

Critical reception

Marcy Playground garnered a mixed reception from music critics. Ronan Munro of NME said that, "What is surprising is how enjoyable this window on Wozniak's soul is: his lazy drawl and gentle melodies coating his misery in a pop sheen... the mood remains resolutely downbeat but the angst is not imposing." James P. Wisdom of Pitchfork stated that Marcy Playground was "the most soothingly mellow and pleasant thing [he] had heard in a long time." AllMusic's Stephen Thomas Erlewine felt that "only a handful" of the album's tracks are as memorable as "Sex and Candy", while adding that "those moments are what make Marcy Playground a promising, albeit imperfect, debut."

Robert Christgau graded the album as a "dud", indicating "a bad record whose details rarely merit further thought." Chuck Eddy of Rolling Stone heavily panned the album for its subpar musicianship, saying that it "sets icky new standards for commercial-post-alternative callowness." Dan Weiss of LA Weekly deemed it the twelfth-worst album of the 1990s, opining that aside from the singles "Sex and Candy" and "Saint Joe on the School Bus," the album is "folksy, opiate-obsessed bullshit".

Track listing

Personnel
Credits adapted from liner notes.

Marcy Playground
John Wozniak – lead vocals, guitar
Dylan Keefe – bass, backing vocals
Dan Rieser – drums, backing vocals

Additional musicians
Glen Braver – bass on "Poppies"
Jared Kotler – bass on "Sex and Candy", "Sherry Fraser", "One More Suicide" and "The Vampires of New York", drums on all songs except "Saint Joe on the School Bus"
Edgar Mills – bass on "Ancient Walls of Flowers" and "Opium"
Jen Handler – cello on "One More Suicide"

Production
John Wozniak – production
Jim Sabella – engineering
Ken Gioia – engineering, mixing
Marcy Playground – mixing
Greg Calbi – mastering

Additional personnel
Henry Marquez – art direction
Robert Laverdiere – package design
James Wojcik – cover and color photo
Chris Black – black-and-white photo

Charts

Weekly charts

Year-end charts

Certifications

References

External links
Official Myspace Page
Official Website
Official Facebook

1997 debut albums
Marcy Playground albums
Capitol Records albums

Works about suicide
Songs about death
Suicide